This article shows the roster of all participating teams at the 2018 FIVB Volleyball Men's World Championship.

Pool A

Argentina
The following is the Argentine roster in the 2018 World Championship.

Head coach: Julio Velasco

Belgium
The following is the Belgian roster in the 2018 World Championship.

Head coach:  Andrea Anastasi

Dominican Republic
The following is the Dominican roster in the 2018 World Championship.

Head coach:  Alexander Gutiérrez

Italy
The following is the Italian roster in the 2018 World Championship.

Head coach: Gianlorenzo Blengini

Japan
The following is the Japanese roster in the 2018 World Championship.

Head coach: Yuichi Nakagaichi

Slovenia
The following is the Slovenian roster in the 2018 World Championship.

Head coach:  Slobodan Kovač

Pool B

Brazil
The following is the Brazilian roster in the 2018 World Championship.

Head coach: Renan Dal Zotto

Canada
The following is the Canadian roster in the 2018 World Championship.

Head coach:  Stéphane Antiga

China
The following is the Chinese roster in the 2018 World Championship.

Head coach:  Raúl Lozano

Egypt
The following is the Egyptian roster in the 2018 World Championship.

Head coach: Mohamed Moselhy Ibrahim

France
The following is the French roster in the 2018 World Championship.

Head coach: Laurent Tillie

Netherlands
The following is the Dutch roster in the 2018 World Championship.

Head coach: Gido Vermeulen

Pool C

Australia
The following is the Australian roster in the 2018 World Championship.

Head coach: Mark Lebedew

Cameroon
The following is the Cameroonian roster in the 2018 World Championship.

Head coach: Blaise Mayam Re Niof

Russia
The following is the Russian roster in the 2018 World Championship.

Head coach: Sergey Shlyapnikov

Serbia
The following is the Serbian roster in the 2018 World Championship.

Head coach: Nikola Grbić

Tunisia
The following is the Tunisian roster in the 2018 World Championship.

Head coach:  Antonio Giacobbe

United States
The following is the American roster in the 2018 World Championship.

Head coach: John Speraw

Pool D

Bulgaria
The following is the Bulgarian roster in the 2018 World Championship.

Head coach: Plamen Konstantinov

Cuba
The following is the Cuban roster in the 2018 World Championship.

Head coach: Nicolas Vives

Finland
The following is the Finnish roster in the 2018 World Championship.

Head coach: Tuomas Sammelvuo

Iran
The following is the Iranian roster in the 2018 World Championship.

Head coach:  Igor Kolaković

Poland
The following is the Polish roster in the 2018 World Championship.

Head coach:  Vital Heynen

Puerto Rico
The following is the Puerto Rican roster in the 2018 World Championship.

Head coach: Oswald Antonetti

See also

2018 FIVB Volleyball Women's World Championship squads

References

External links
Teams

S
FIVB Volleyball Men's World Championship squads